Muchnic is a surname. Notable people with the surname include:

Helen Muchnic, American academic
Suzanne Muchnic (born 1940), American art writer

See also
Muchnik